Tays may refer to:

 Tays Center, indoor arena in Alamogordo, New Mexico 
 Ba Tays, a village in Yemen
 Jimmy Tays (1899-1986), American football player
 Tampere University Hospital commonly abbreviated as TAYS (Tampereen yliopistollinen sairaala)

See also
 Tay (disambiguation)
 Taze (disambiguation)